Pyuridae is a family of tunicates.

Species of Halocynthia, Microcosmus and Pyura spp. are eaten as seafoods.

Genera
Bathypera
Bathypyura Monniot & Monniot, 1973
Boltenia
Bolteniopsis
Claudenus Kott, 1998 
Cratostigma
Ctenyura
Culeolus
Halocynthia
Hartmeyeria
Herdmania
Heterostigma
Microcosmus
Pyura
Pyurella

See also
Sea peach

References

Stolidobranchia
Tunicate families